Yan An (simplified Chinese: 闫安; born 12 January 1993) is a Chinese table tennis player.

References

Chinese male table tennis players
1993 births
Living people
Table tennis players from Beijing
Universiade gold medalists for China
Universiade silver medalists for China
Universiade medalists in table tennis
Medalists at the 2011 Summer Universiade